Manchester Central Mosque and Islamic Cultural Centre (also known as “Victoria Park Mosque”) is a mosque in Manchester, England. Sometimes referred to as Jamia Mosque, it is situated in the middle of Victoria Park, Manchester close to the Curry Mile. It plays a key role in Manchester's Muslim community. Imam and Khateeb Muhammad Arshad Misbahi and Qari Hafiz Javed Akhtar are leaders of the mosque. Qari Javed also leads taraweeh prayers in Ramadan.

The Victoria Park Mosque began as two adjacent houses, one owned by the Syrian Textile Merchants operating in Manchester since the early 1900s, and the other owned by the mainly Indian community living in the nearby areas of Rusholme and Longsight.

In 1971, the Jamiat-ul-Muslimeen, Manchester, commenced work on a purpose-built mosque in Victoria Park and the two houses were demolished and the "new look" Mosque took its current form. Several expansions and modifications have taken place over the years.

This mosque acts according to the teachings of the Barelwi sect of the Indian Subcontinent.

Mohammed Amin, a Retired Partner at PricewaterhouseCoopers, currently sits on the Mosque committee.

See also
Islam in England
Asian Sunnis
British Muslim Forum
 Swedish Muslims

References

External links
Jamia Masjid Manchester Official Website
Markaz Darulehsan Manchester
Mosques map in UK

Mosques in Manchester
Barelvi mosques